Norran (previously named Norra Västerbotten) is a Swedish language social democratic newspaper published in Skellefteå, Sweden.

History and profile
Norran was founded by a group of liberal newspaper enthusiasts led by Anton Wikström from Jörn in 1910. The first official edition was published 1 January 1911. The paper is owned by the foundation Skelleftepress. It is published in Berliner format in Skellefteå, and chiefly distributed in the northern parts of Västerbotten. The stated position of the editorial is liberal.

Most of the newspaper's local articles are written in Skellefteå, but it also has local editors in Arjeplog, Arvidsjaur, Malå and Norsjö.

It has been published on the Internet since February 1996 and the main news service is freely available.

In correlation with the newspaper's 100-year-anniversary, the staff announced on 4 January 2010 that its name would be changed into Norran, a name which has been used by its readers for decades. The official web site's URL was already norran.se.

Circulation
In 1959 the circulation of the paper was 24,000 copies. The paper had a circulation of 23,200 copies in 2012 and 22,700 copies in 2013.

Editors-in-chief
Anton Wikström 1913–1935
Zolo Stärner 1935–1953
K H Wikström 1953–1978
Rolf Brandt 1978–1989
Stig Ericsson 1989–1997
Birger Thuresson 1997–1999
Ola Theander 1999-2004
Sofia Olsson Olsén 2004–2006
Anders Steinvall 2006–2008
Anette Novak 2009–2011
Lars Andersson 2012–

See also 
List of Swedish newspapers
Dik Manusch

References

External links
Norran official archive server
Example for an archived news article

1910 establishments in Sweden
Newspapers established in 1910
Newspapers published in Sweden
Swedish-language newspapers
Mass media in Skellefteå
Västerbotten